is a Japanese ice hockey player for Daishin Hockey and the Japanese national team.

She represented Japan at the 2019 IIHF Women's World Championship.

References

External links

2002 births
Living people
Japanese women's ice hockey forwards
People from Kushiro, Hokkaido